The North American Sabreliner, later sold as the Rockwell Sabreliner, is an American mid-sized business jet developed by North American Aviation. It was offered to the United States Air Force (USAF) in response to its Utility Trainer Experimental (UTX) program. It was named "Sabreliner" due to the similarity of the wing and tail to North American's F-86 Sabre jet fighter. Military variants, designated T-39 Sabreliner, were used by the USAF, United States Navy (USN), and United States Marine Corps (USMC) after the USAF placed an initial order in 1959. The Sabreliner was also developed into a commercial variant.

Design and development
North American Aviation began development of the Sabreliner as an in-house project, and in response to the UTX request for proposals, offered a military version to the USAF. UTX combined two different roles, personnel transport and combat readiness training, into the same aircraft.

The civilian version prototype, which carried the model number NA-265, made its first flight on September 16, 1958. It was powered by two General Electric YJ85 turbojet engines. The type received its Federal Aviation Administration (FAA) type certificate in April 1963. The UTX candidate, designated the T-39A, was identical in configuration to the NA-265, but when the contract was awarded and the T-39A entered production, it was powered by two Pratt & Whitney JT12A-8 turbojet engines.

The civilian production version, or Series 40, was slightly refined over the prototype, with more speed and a roomier cabin. The cabin was made taller for the Series 70 and General Electric CF700 turbofans were installed for the Series 75A (also branded as the Series 80).

By 1973, North American had merged with Rockwell Standard under the name Rockwell International. In 1976 Rockwell contracted Raisbeck Engineering to redesign the wing of the Sabreliner series. The resulting Raisbeck Mark V wing was the first supercritical wing in service in the United States.  The Mark V wing was combined with Garrett TFE731 turbofan engines, to create the Series 65. Sabreliner models 60 and 80 were retrofitted with the Mark V wing as the Series 60A (STC SA687NW) and Series 80A (STC SA847NW).

Sabreliner production came to a close in 1981. The next year, Rockwell sold its Sabreliner division to a private equity firm which formed Sabreliner Corporation, the support organization for continuing operators.

Operational history
Over 800 Sabreliners were produced, of which 200 were T-39s. A number of retired military T-39s have also entered the civilian world since the military versions also carry FAA type certification. , 56 examples have been lost in accidents.  The Series 65 was the last series run and 76 of them were produced, mostly for the private market. Monsanto has the oldest continuously operating company corporate jet division starting with its purchase of a Sabreliner 40.

T-39s were used in support of combat operations in Southeast Asia during the Vietnam War. In late 1965 T-39s replaced Martin B-57 Canberras on flights to transport high-priority cargo, such as exposed film from photoreconnaissance missions, from outlying bases to Saigon.

The original Navy version, the T3J-1, redesignated T-39D after the 1962 redesignation of USN/USMC/USCG aircraft, was initially fitted with the radar system from the McDonnell F3H-1 Demon all-weather fighter and used as a radar trainer for pilots of that aircraft. The T-39D aircraft was subsequently introduced into the Basic Naval Aviation Observer (NAO), later Student Naval Flight Officer (SNFO) program.  Three versions of the T-39D were used throughout the 1960s, '70s, and '80s: one without radar for high altitude instrument navigation training and low altitude visual navigation training in the SNFO Intermediate syllabus; a second variant equipped with the APQ-126 radar from the LTV A-7 Corsair II for training primarily bombardier/navigators, reconnaissance attack navigators, and electronic countermeasures officers in attack aircraft; and a third variant with the APQ-94 radar for training pilots of the Vought F-8 Crusader.

The T-39N and T-39G are currently used in the NFO Strike and Strike Fighter syllabi in training USN and USMC student Naval Flight Officers, as well as various NATO/allied/coalition student navigators. Foreign students also train in the T-39 in place of the Beechcraft T-1 Jayhawk during the Intermediate Jet syllabus.

The Sabreliner requires a minimum crew of two and, depending on cabin configuration, can carry up to seven passengers (NA-265 through NA-265-40) or ten passengers (NA-265-60 and subsequent models).  As a Navy flight training aircraft, it will typically fly with a pilot, one or two NFO instructors, and two to three student NFOs or student navigators/CSOs.

Being derived from the F-86, the Sabreliner is the only business jet authorised for aerobatics and is used by two California companies: Flight Research Inc. and Patriots Jet Team, for inflight upset-recovery training to reduce loss-of-control, involving full stalls, fully inverted flight, and 20-40° descents in a 2.8g envelope, within its 3g rating.

Al-Qaeda use
Between 1993 and 1994, Osama bin Laden reportedly owned and used a former USAF T-39A, which had been converted to civilian use and refurbished at Van Nuys Airport. An Egyptian pilot and bin Laden proxy, Essam al-Ridi, lawfully purchased the aircraft from a U.S. broker in California in 1992, claiming to represent wealthy Egyptians. Al Ridi reported to have personally delivered the plane to bin Laden—who was then exiled in Khartoum, Sudan—in January 1993. There, the jet was reportedly used to ferry five Al-Qaeda operatives to Kenya to agitate tribal insurgency against US peacekeeping troops in nearby Somalia; one of the passengers was allegedly senior bin Laden deputy Mohammed Atef.

More than a year later, around October 1994, the jet overran the runway in Khartoum Airport and crashed into a sand dune. The aircraft was badly damaged and subsequently abandoned due to high anticipated repair costs; both al Ridi and Al-Qaeda-trained pilot Ihab Mohammad Ali separately claimed to have been at the controls (the aircraft is fitted with dual controls). In later years, Ali testified that, in 1995, bin Laden asked him to ram the plane against that of Egyptian president Hosni Mubarak, despite the aircraft having never been repaired after the Khartoum accident.

Variants

Civilian
Sabreliner
(NA-265 or NA-246) Prototype powered by two General Electric J85-GE-X turbojet engines, one built sometimes unofficially called XT-39.

Sabreliner 40
(NA-265-40 or NA-282) Civil production variant for 11 passengers powered by two Pratt & Whitney JT12A-6A or -8 engines, two cabin windows each side; 65 built.
Sabreliner 40A
A Sabreliner marketing version of the Sabre 40 with lighter avionics similar to the Aero Commander, also produced by Rockwell International at the time.  In addition to the lighter avionics package, the interior was redesigned for lighter construction. 
Sabreliner 50
(NA-265-50 or NA-287) One built in 1964 as a Model 60 with Pratt & Whitney JT12A engines, experimental platform for radome nose cowling.
Sabreliner 60
(NA-265-60 or NA-306) Stretched Model 40 for 12 passengers with two Pratt & Whitney JT12A-8 engines, five cabin windows each side, 130 built.
Sabreliner 60A
Series 60 with Mark V super-critical wing.
Sabreliner 65
(NA-265-65 or NA-465) Based on the Series 60 with Garrett AiResearch TFE731-3R-1D engines and new Mark V super-critical wing, 76 built.
Sabreliner 75
(NA-265-70 or NA-370) Series 60A with a raised cabin roof for greater cabin headroom, two Pratt & Whitney JT12A-8 engines; nine built.
Sabreliner 75A (Sabreliner 80)
(NA-265-80 or NA-380) Sabreliner 75 powered by two General Electric CF700 turbofan engines, 66 built.
Sabreliner 80A
Series 80 with Mark V supercritical wing.

Military

T-39A
Pilot proficiency trainer and utility transport for USAF, based on Sabreliner prototype but powered by two  Pratt & Whitney J60-P3 engines, 143 built.
CT-39A
T-39A modified as a cargo and personnel transport, Pratt & Whitney J60-P3/-3A engines.
NT-39A
One T-39A modified for electronic systems testing.
T-39B
Radar systems trainer for USAF, fitted with avionics of the Republic F-105D Thunderchief fighter bomber (including R-14 NASARR main radar and AN/APN-131 doppler radar) and with stations for three trainees, six built.
T-39C
Proposed radar systems trainer for USAF fitted with avionics of McDonnell F-101B Voodoo all-weather interceptor. Unbuilt.
T3J-1
Pre-production designation for T-39D.
T-39D
Radar systems trainer for USN, 1962 redesignation of T3J-1, Pratt & Whitney J60-P3 engines, 42 delivered from 1963, equipped with AN/APQ-94 radar for radar intercept officer training and the AN/APQ-126 radar for bombardier/navigator training.
CT-39E
USN cargo/transport version, with JT12A-8 engines, originally designated VT-39E, seven second-hand aircraft.
T-39F
Electronic warfare crew training conversion of the T-39A for USAF training of F-105G "Wild Weasel" crews. 
CT-39G
USN cargo/transport version based on the stretched fuselage Sabreliner 60, Pratt & Whitney JT12A engines equipped with thrust reversers, 13 bought.
T-39G
CT-39G modified for the Undergraduate Flight Officer Training program.

T-39N
Navy trainer for the Undergraduate Flight Officer Training program.

Operators

Argentina
 Argentine Air Force (One series 75A)
 Argentine Army Aviation (One series 75A)
Bolivia
 Bolivian Air Force (One series 65 FAB-005 used as military and Presidential transport)
Ecuador
 Ecuadorian Air Force
Mexico
 Mexican Air Force
 Mexican Navy

Sweden
 Swedish Air Force (One series 65, local designation Tp 86)
United States
 United States Air Force (149 with T-39 designations)
 United States Navy (51 with T-39 designations)
 BAE Systems Inc. (T-39A)
 Federal Aviation Administration (Series 80)
 National Test Pilot School
 Patriots Jet Team (Series 60/60SC for Aircraft upset Prevention and Recovery Training)

Accidents and incidents
As of December 2019, there have been 62 recorded incidents and accidents involving the Sabreliner, resulting in 153 deaths. Listed below are a select few of the most notable ones.
28 January 1964: a USAF T-39 Sabreliner flying from West Germany on a training mission crosses into East German airspace and is shot down by a Soviet Mikoyan-Gurevich MiG-19 near Vogelsberg, killing all three on board.
13 April 1973: a Sabreliner NA-265-60 operated by Continental Airlines, N743R, crashes after takeoff at Montrose Airport following the uncommanded deployment of the port-side thrust reverser. The two pilots, the only occupants of the aircraft, are killed and the aircraft is destroyed by impact forces and a post-impact fire.
9 February 1974: a USAF T-39A Sabreliner reports landing gear problems while taking off from Peterson Air Force Base in Colorado Springs, Colorado, and a USAF Boeing NKC-135 flying from Seattle to Albuquerque meets it to conduct an airborne visual inspection of its landing gear at an altitude of 23,000 ft (7,010 m). The T-39 strikes the NKC-135's tail and crashes near Colorado Springs, killing all seven people aboard. The NKC-135 sustains only minor damage and lands safely at Kirtland Air Force Base in Albuquerque.
20 April 1985: a USAF CT-39A, 62-4496, overruns the runway at Wilkes-Barre/Scranton International Airport due to brake failure on landing. The aircraft coasts down an embankment and burns, killing all five persons aboard, including General Jerome F. O'Malley, Commander, Tactical Air Command.
5 July 2007: a CT-39A cargo aircraft operated by Mexican carrier Jett Paqueteria, XA-TFL, overruns Runway 02 at Culiacán International Airport after the pilots are unable to lift off and initiate a rejected takeoff. The aircraft crashes into vehicles on a nearby highway, killing all three crew members on the Sabreliner and seven persons on the ground. The accident is attributed to possible horizontal stabilizer failure, poor aircrew training and crew resource management, a failure to follow proper procedures, and crew pressure to depart before the airfield was to be temporarily closed for a presidential visit.
16 August 2015: a private Sabreliner NA265-60SC, N442RM, collides with a Cessna 172M, N1285U, on approach to Brown Field Municipal Airport in California, killing the five people on board the two aircraft. The cause was found to be air traffic control (ATC) error. This accident, together with another fatal 2015 mid-air collision under similar circumstances, prompts the U.S. National Transportation Safety Board to recommend that the FAA more strongly emphasize scenario-based training for controllers.

Aircraft on display

 CT-39A, AF Ser. No. 60-3495, on pylon display at Scott Air Force Base, Illinois
 T-39A, AF Ser. No. 61-0634, Dyess Linear Air Park, Dyess Air Force Base, Texas
CT-38A, AF Ser. No. 61-0650, Snohomish County Airport/Paine Field, Washington 
 CT-39A, AF Ser. No. 62-4449, Pima Air and Space Museum, adjacent to Davis-Monthan Air Force Base, Tucson, Arizona
 CT-39A, AF Ser. No. 62-4461, at the Museum of Aviation, Robins Air Force Base, Warner Robins, Georgia
 CT-39A, AF Ser. No. 62-4462, at Travis Air Force Base Heritage Center / Jimmy Doolittle Air & Space Museum, Travis Air Force Base, Fairfield, California
 CT-39A, AF Ser. No. 62-4465, at March Field Air Museum, March Air Reserve Base (former March Air Force Base), Riverside, California
 CT-39A, AF Ser. No. 62-4478, at the Presidential Gallery of the National Museum of the United States Air Force, Wright-Patterson Air Force Base, Ohio 
 T-39D, BuNo 150985, Sherman Field area, Naval Air Station Pensacola, Florida 
 T-39D, BuNo 151338, Southern Museum of Flight, Birmingham-Shuttlesworth International Airport, Birmingham, Alabama
 T–39D, BuNo 150987, Patuxent River Naval Air Museum, Lexington Park, Maryland
 T-39E, AF Ser. No. undetermined, Air Classics Museum of Aviation, Aurora Municipal Airport, Sugar Grove, Illinois
 CT-39G, BuNo 160056, National Naval Aviation Museum, Naval Air Station Pensacola, Florida 
 Sabreliner 40 at City Museum in St. Louis, Missouri. Two are displayed as interactive works of art.
Sabreliner 40 at National Electronics Museum in Linthicum, Maryland. Tail #N168W was a flying test bed used by Northrop Grumman’s Mission Systems Flight Test Facility.
 Sabreliner 50 at Evergreen Aviation & Space Museum in McMinnville, Oregon. It was donated to the museum in January 2013

Specifications (T3J-1/T-39D)

See also

References
Notes

Bibliography
 Type Certificate Data Sheet A2WE

External links

 Civil support site, Sabreliner Corporation
 T-39 / CT-39 Sabreliner. GlobalSecurity.org.

Sabreliner
Sabreliner
1950s United States business aircraft
1950s United States military utility aircraft
Low-wing aircraft
Twinjets
Aircraft first flown in 1959